Freddie King Powell (born November 1, 1950) is an American politician who served in the Georgia House of Representatives from the 151st district from 2005 to 2009, and in the Georgia State Senate from the 12th district since 2009.

References

External links
 Profile at the Georgia State Senate

1950 births
Living people
Democratic Party members of the Georgia House of Representatives
Democratic Party Georgia (U.S. state) state senators
21st-century American politicians